Pelops was King of Sparta of the Eurypontid dynasty. He was the son of Lykourgos.

He was born sometime around 210 BC, but his father soon died that year. Since he was an infant, a regent reigned, first Machanidas and then Nabis. In 199 BC however, Pelops was assassinated by Nabis, who assumed the throne. He was the last of the Eurypontid Dynasty.

3rd-century BC rulers
3rd-century BC Spartans
Eurypontid kings of Sparta
210s BC births
199 BC deaths
2nd-century BC murdered monarchs
Ancient child monarchs